Jan Hřebejk (born 27 June 1967) is a Czech film director and actor.

Life and career
Born in Prague, Hřebejk graduated from high school in 1987 and continued his studies at the Film and TV School of the Academy of Performing Arts in Prague (FAMU) from 1987 to 1991, majoring in screenplay and dramaturgy. He was at FAMU alongside Petr Jarchovský, who is also his classmate from high school and subsequently a frequent collaborator as a screenwriter.

While at FAMU, Hřebejk directed and produced two short films, Co všechno chcete vědět o sexu a bojíte se to prožít (1988) and L. P. 1948 (1989), from scripts written by his classmate Petr Zelenka. His professional directorial debut was a short film for Czech TV, Nedělejte nic, pokud k tomu nemáte vážný důvod (1991), also written by Zelenka. His films caught the attention of viewers and critics, and entered student film festivals.

Also while still at FAMU, Hřebejk and Jarchovský wrote a comedy screenplay inspired by Hřebejk's background at a summer camp, entitled Pejme písen dohola. This screenplay was filmed in 1990 as a full-length feature by director Ondřej Trojan. In 1992, Hřebejk filmed a version of his FAMU graduate thesis, an interpretation of Egon Hostovský's Dobrocinny vecírek.

This was followed by Big Beat, a rock and roll comedy set in the 1950s and Hřebejk's first major box office success. The film was written by Jarchovský, based on a story by Petr Šabach, and won four Czech Lion awards, including Best Film and Best Director for Hřebejk. In 1996, Hřebejk directed a children's TV series, Kde padají hvezdy, which was syndicated around Europe. The following year, Hřebejk and Jarchovský won awards from the Film and Television Association and the Literary Fund for their contribution to dramatic television programming, for three episodes they wrote for the TV series Bachelors.

The writing and production team behind Big Beat subsequently reunited for two further films, Cosy Dens (1999) and Divided We Fall (2000), both of which became enormously successful within the Czech Republic.

His 2009 film Kawasaki's Rose was selected as the Czech entry for the Best Foreign Language Film at the 83rd Academy Awards, but didn't make the final shortlist.

Filmography

Director
Cinema
 Co všechno chcete vědět o sexu a bojíte se to prožít (1988) – student movie
 L.P. 1948 (1989) – short movie
 Nedělejte nic, pokud k tomu nemáte vážný důvod (1991) – short movie
 Big Beat ("Šakalí léta", 1993)
 Czech Soda ("Česká soda", 1998)
 Cosy Dens ("Pelíšky", 1999)
 Divided We Fall ("Musíme si pomáhat", 2000) – 73rd Academy Awards nomination
 Pupendo (2003)
 Up and Down ("Horem pádem", 2004)
 Beauty in Trouble ("Kráska v nesnázích", 2006)
 Teddy Bear ("Medvídek") 2007
 I'm All Good ("U mě dobrý", 2008)
 Shameless ("Nestyda", 2008)
 Kawasaki's Rose ("Kawasakiho růže", 2009)
 Innocence ("Nevinnost", 2011)
 The Holy Quaternity ("Svatá Čtveřice", 2012)
 Honeymoon ("Líbánky" 2013)
 Zakázané uvolnění (2014)
 The Teacher ("Učitelka", 2016)

Television
 The Charity Ball ("Dobročinný večírek", 1992)
 Czech Soda ("Česká soda", 1993–97) – TV-series
 GEN: The Gallery of the Nation's Elite ("GEN: Galerie elity národa", 1993–94) – documentary
 Vladimír Jiránek by Jan Hřebejk ("Vladimír Jiránek pohledem Jana Hřebejka")
 GENUS ("GENUS", 1995–96) – documentary
 Michal Viewegh by Jan Hřebejk
 Vladimír Mišík by Jan Hřebejk
 Dominik Hašek by Jan Hřebejk
 60 ("60", 1996) – documentary
 How's the Living ("Jak se žije", 1997) – short documentary TV-series
 Where Stars Fall ("Kde padají hvězdy", 1996) – TV series
 The Last Concert ("Poslední koncert", 1997)
 The Window ("Okno", 1997) – short
 The Good News ("Dobrá zpráva", 1997)

Opera
 Tomorrow There Will Be... ("Zítra se bude...", 2010)

Actor
 Co všechno chcete vědět o sexu a bojíte se to prožít (1988) – student movie
 Šeptej (1996) as Woody
 Year of the Devil ("Rok ďábla", 1996) 
 Úžasný rokenrol v Čechách aneb Jeď, Honzo, jeď (2002) as himself
 Operace Hokejdo (2004) as himself
 Největší z Čechů (2010) as Chairman of the grant committee
 Rozmarná léta českého filmu (2011) – documentary, as himself

Other contributions
 Pějme píseň dohola (1990) – writer and narrator

References

External links

 
 Interview with Jan Hřebejk at Eurochannel

1967 births
Living people
Sun in a Net Awards winners
Film directors from Prague